Steingarten is a studio album by Pole. It was released by his own label, ~scape, in 2007.

Critical reception
At Metacritic, which assigns a weighted average score out of 100 to reviews from mainstream critics, the album received an average score of 82% based on 10 reviews, indicating "universal acclaim".

Tim O'Neil of PopMatters gave the album 8 stars out of 10, saying, "There's none of the indulgence that often bedevils minimalism, as the album clocks in at a modest 45 minutes." He added, "Every track is just about a complete microcosm unto itself, unfolding with precision and lingering for just long enough for the listener to begin to get a grasp of the many subtleties on display, but not long enough for it to wear out its welcome."

The Wire named it the 17th best album of 2007.

Track listing

References

External links
 

2007 albums
Pole (musician) albums